Sgonico is a comune (municipality) in the Province of Trieste in the Italian region Friuli-Venezia Giulia, located about  northwest of Trieste, on the border with Slovenia. According to the 1971 census, 81.6% of the population are Slovenes.

Sgonico borders these municipalities: Duino-Aurisina, Monrupino, Sežana (Slovenia), and Trieste.

Name
The name of the settlement was first attested in 1309 as Swonich (and as de Svonicho in 1348, de Vonicho in 1373, de Champanilo in 1374, de villa Svonich in 1421, Suonich and de Suonigo in 1525, and Sgonico in 1819). The name is of Slovene origin, derived from the Slovene common noun zvonik, "belfry", (in reference to the church of Saint Michael). The phonological change zvonik to zgonik is characteristic of the local Slovene dialect; cf. also dialect zgon, "bell", from zvon.

Geography 
Clima - tbd

History 
tbd

Economy 
Two big Hi-Tech Companies have their EMEA global or national headquarters located in Sgonico: Telit and u-blox both of them located near Stazione di Prosecco, the biggest and more important area of manufacturing and services companies in Sgonico.
Other small realities are mainly working in the crafts and freight forwarders (transportation) area close to Stazione di Prosecco and Industrial Zone (Zona Artigianale - Sgonico/Zgonik).

Demographic evolution

Language 
tbd

Culture 
Education
tbd
 Music
tbd
 Sports
tbd

Transport

Points of interest 
 Grotta Gigante
 Giardino Botanico Carsiana
 Gabrovizza / Gabrovec

References

See also 
Karst Plateau
Gorizia and Gradisca
Julian March
Slovene Lands

Cities and towns in Friuli-Venezia Giulia